Dawley Hamlets is a civil parish in Telford and Wrekin, Shropshire, England.

The parish covers Horsehay, Doseley, Little Dawley (also traditionally known as Dawley Parva) and Aqueduct.

The name Dawley comes from Old English meaning woodland clearing associated with a man called Dealla.

See also
 Listed buildings in Dawley Hamlets
 Great Dawley
 William Ball (Shropshire Giant), buried at St Luke's Church, Doseley

References

Telford and Wrekin
Civil parishes in Shropshire